The Tropidopolinae are a subfamily of Acrididae in the Orthoptera: Caelifera. Species can be found in Africa, southern Europe and Asia.

Tribes and genera 
The Orthoptera Species File lists two tribes, with the following:

Tristriini
Authority: Mishchenko 1945
 Tristria Stål, 1873 – equatorial Africa and Asia (including Indo-China and Sulawesi)
 Tristriella Descamps & Wintrebert, 1967 - Madagascar

Tropidopolini
Authority: Jacobson 1905
 Tropidopola Stål, 1873 – central – northern Africa, southern Europe; Asia: near East, India up to Siberia

tribe unassigned
 Afroxyrrhepes Uvarov, 1943 – equatorial Africa
 Chloroxyrrhepes Uvarov, 1943 – west Africa
 Dabba (insect) Uvarov, 1933 - Iran
 Homoxyrrhepes Uvarov, 1926 - Africa
 Limnippa Uvarov, 1941 - monotypic: E. Africa
 Mesopsilla Ramme, 1929 - monotypic: Congo
 Musimoja Uvarov, 1953 - monotypic: Angola
 Neooxyrrhepes Khan & Usmani, 2019 - monotypic: Assam
 Petamella Giglio-Tos, 1907 - Africa
 Pseudotristria Dirsh, 1961 – southern Africa

References

External links 
 
 

Acrididae
Caelifera
Orthoptera subfamilies